Granuel Lika (born 22 October 1998) is an Albanian professional footballer who plays as a left back ( but he is also capable of playing as a left midfielder ) for Albanian club KF Erzeni.

References

External links
 Granuel Lika profile FSHF.org
 
 

1998 births
Living people
People from Lezhë County
Association football fullbacks
Albanian footballers
Albania youth international footballers
KF Teuta Durrës players
KF Erzeni players
Kategoria Superiore players
Kategoria e Parë players